Stade Amari Daou is a multi-use stadium in Ségou, Mali that seats 30,000 people and it was opened in 2001. It is currently used mostly for football matches and serves as a home ground of AS Biton.  It has also hosted matches for the 2002 African Cup of Nations.

Amari Daou
Ségou
Sports venues completed in 2001
2001 establishments in Mali